Unio crassus, the thick shelled river mussel, is a species of freshwater mussel, an aquatic bivalve mollusk in the family Unionidae, the river mussels. 

Subspecies
 † Unio crassus jaeckeli Modell, 1950 
 † Unio crassus klemmi Modell, 1957

Ecology
As part of newly discovered reproductive behaviour, this mollusc crawls up to the edge of the water, exposing its excurrent aperture, and then lets loose a stream of water. The fountain of water often contains glochidia, and it is suggested that this spurting behavior may facilitate dispersal of mussel larvae (video).

Decline
The thick shelled river mussel declined during the 20th century everywhere in Europe due to deteriorating water quality, habitat fragmentation and host fish limitation.

Distribution
Its native distribution is Europe and Western Asia.

 It is mentioned in annexes II and IV of Habitats Directive.
 Croatia
 Czech Republic - in Bohemia, in Moravia, endangered (EN). Its conservation status in 2004-06 was unfavourable (U2) according to a report for the European Commission in accordance with the Habitats Directive.
 Finland - in southern Finland. Vulnerable.
 France
 Germany - critically endangered (vom Aussterben bedroht) In Germany this bivalve has disappeared from 90% of its former range.
 Netherlands - locally extinct. In the Netherlands it has not been seen alive after 1968 and is most likely extinct in that country.
 Poland - endangered
 Slovakia - nearly threatened
 Sweden - very rare
 Denmark - very rare

References

External links
 The Mussel Project Web Site
 Fauna Europaea

crassus
Bivalves of Asia
Bivalves of Europe
Freshwater bivalves
Bivalves described in 1788